Stojanów may refer to the following places in Poland:
Stojanów, Lower Silesian Voivodeship (south-west Poland)
Stojanów, Łódź Voivodeship (central Poland)